Alfredo García-Baró (born 5 February 1972) is a Cuban sprinter specializing in the 100 metres.

Career

He finished fourth with the Cuban 4 × 100 metres relay team at the 1997 and 1999 World Championships. On both occasions 2000 Olympic relay bronze medalists Iván García and Luis Alberto Pérez-Rionda were part of the team.

Achievements

External links
 

1972 births
Cuban male sprinters
Goodwill Games medalists in athletics
Living people
Central American and Caribbean Games gold medalists for Cuba
Competitors at the 1998 Central American and Caribbean Games
Athletes (track and field) at the 1999 Pan American Games
Central American and Caribbean Games medalists in athletics
Competitors at the 1998 Goodwill Games
Pan American Games competitors for Cuba
20th-century Cuban people
21st-century Cuban people